Susanna Cox (1785–1809) was a young domestic servant in Berks County, Pennsylvania, convicted of murdering her illegitimate infant son. On the morning of February 17, 1809, her employer found the baby's body in a rubbish bin behind his property. Susanna was immediately questioned, and while she admitted that the baby was hers, she insisted that it was stillborn. After a short investigation, she was convicted on April 7, 1809. Her the court-appointed lawyers did little to defend her and no witnesses were called to testify on her behalf. After a short imprisonment in the local sheriff's home, she was executed in Reading on June 10, 1809.

Berks County was home to large populations of German-language immigrants who settled there in the eighteenth and early nineteenth centuries. Cox shared this German heritage (referred to as Pennsylvania German or Pennsylvania Dutch). Cox was an uneducated woman who spoke a German dialect and could do little to defend herself in court. She had worked for the family of Jacob Geehr for eleven years, having been born into a poor family with few resources to educate or care for her. Little is known about her life before she came to work for the Geehrs, as she could not read or write and spent most of her time caring for the Geehrs' children.

While Susanna insisted through the investigation and trial that the baby had been stillborn, a medical examination of the body the day it was found saw the baby's jaw broken and fabric stuffed down its throat. Susanna would become the 8th woman in Pennsylvania since the state's founding to be executed for the crime of killing her illegitimate child.

After a brief trial, Cox was hanged in Reading, Pennsylvania, on June 10, 1809. Following her execution, her story gained such sympathy that it was written in a ballad and widely circulated in German and in English through newspapers and broadsides. This immensely popular ballad was printed in over 88 editions in its broadside form throughout the nineteenth and twentieth centuries. Today, the ballad is read at the annual summer Kutztown Folk Festival.

Musical Adaptation
In the 21st century, there have been several musical adaptions of the topic, including the following works:
Brintzenhoff, Keith: "Ballad of Susanna Cox" (Keith Brintzenhoff with Mitch Miller, Mike Hertzog & Karlene Brintzenhoff)
Werner, Michael: "Die Gschicht vun die Susanna Gax" (Michael Werner & The New Paltz Band), 2014

General references

Suter, Patricia, with Russell and Corinne Earnest, The Hanging of Susanna Cox: The True Story of Pennsylvania's Most Notorious Infanticide and the Legend That's Kept It Alive (Mechanicsburg, Pa.: Stackpole Books) 2010
Nest, Bathsheba Doran, a fictional play based on the story of Susanna Cox, Samuel French Publisher, 2008.
Earnest, Russell and Corinne, Flying-Leaves and One-Sheets: Pennsylvania German Broadsides, Fraktur, and Their Printers (New Castle, Dela.: Oak Knoll Books, 2005).
Yoder, Don, The Pennsylvania German Broadside: A History and Guide (University Park, Pa.: Pennsylvania State University Press, 2005).
Richards, Louis, "Susanna Cox: Her Crime and its Expiation," Paper read before the Historical Society of Berks County, Pa., 13 March 1900.

References

1785 births
1809 deaths
Executed American women
19th-century executions of American people
People executed by Pennsylvania by hanging
American people executed for murder
People from Berks County, Pennsylvania